The Allen Independent School District is a school district based in Allen, Oklahoma United States.

See also
List of school districts in Oklahoma

References

External links
 Allen Overview

School districts in Oklahoma
Education in Pontotoc County, Oklahoma